Cliff Chenfeld is an American music executive and was the co-founder and co-CEO of Razor & Tie and Kidz Bop.

Personal life

Chenfeld grew up in Columbus, Ohio, and graduated from The Ohio State University and earned his Juris Doctor degree from New York University where he met fellow student Craig Balsam. After practicing law for several years, Chenfeld and Balsam left their law jobs in 1990 and formed Razor & Tie, an independent record label.

Record label

The label initially focused on compilation albums (Monster Ballads) and reissues and has since become one of the leading rock labels in the country with artists such as The Pretty Reckless, Starset, All That Remains, The Sword and Red Sun Rising. In recent years the company has added Washington Square, an alternative leaning imprint and a music publishing company. Razor & Tie Publishing is responsible for No. 1 hits including "Home" by Phillip Phillips, "God Gave Me You" by Blake Shelton, and "Whiskey In My Water" by Tyler Farr.

In 2001, Chenfeld and Balsam launched Kidz Bop, a series of audio releases of kids singing pop hits that are appropriate for children. The franchise has sold more than 16 million albums and become the leading kids' audio brand in the country. Kidz Bop has expanded significantly to include a national tour, merchandise, music videos and a channel on Sirius XM.

In 2015 Concord acquired an undisclosed percentage of Razor & Tie. Concord fully acquired Razor & Tie on January 17, 2018.

Film production

Chenfeld has also been the executive producer of a number of films including Joan Baez: How Sweet The Sound, Serious Moonlight, Concussion, No Pay Nudity and Women Who Kill.

Live Business

In 2019, Chenfeld became a partner in the WonderStruck and Wonderbus Music Festivals, based in Ohio.
78

References

American music industry executives
American film producers
Ohio State University alumni
Living people
Year of birth missing (living people)